Andrew Noble Pope (14 November 1881 – 18 April 1942) was an English cricketer.  Pope's batting style is unknown.  He was born at Clifton, Bristol.

Pope made two first-class appearances for Gloucestershire in the 1911 County Championship, both against Middlesex.  In his first match at Lord's, Gloucestershire won the toss and elected to bat, with Pope being dismissed for a single run by J. T. Hearne in Gloucestershire's first-innings of 137.  Middlesex made 186 in their first-innings, with Gloucestershire then scoring 146 in their second-innings, during which Pope was promoted up the batting order to bat at number three, scoring 29 runs before he was dismissed for a second time by J. T. Hearne.  Middlesex reached their target in their second-innings with seven wickets to spare.  In his second match at the Spa Ground, Gloucester, Middlesex won the toss and elected to bat, making 369 in their first-innings.  Gloucestershire then made just 150 in their first-innings, during which Pope (who kept in this match in place of regular wicket-keeper Jack Board) was dismissed for 4 runs by J. T. Hearne.  Forced to follow-on, Gloucestershire fared better in their second-innings, making just 156.  Pope was again dismissed by J. T. Hearne, after scoring 12 runs.  Middlesex won by an innings and 63 runs.

He died at Cheltenham, Gloucestershire on 18 April 1942.

References

External links
Andrew Pope at ESPNcricinfo
Andrew Pope at CricketArchive

1881 births
1942 deaths
Cricketers from Bristol
English cricketers
Gloucestershire cricketers